Grand Ocean is a restored 1938 hotel building in Saltdean, near Brighton, on the south coast of England.

History 
Grand Ocean was designed by architect RWH Jones with the classic moderne styling of the age, it opened as a luxury hotel in 1938.

During the Second World War the building was taken over by the fire service and used as a fire service college.  It was then bought by Billy Butlin in 1953 and became a Butlin's Holiday camp. IN 2005 a theatrical production, Dirty Wonderland, was staged in the former hotel.

Shortly thereafter the main hotel building was redeveloped into luxury apartments.

Architecture 

Notable features include the internal staircase and foyer.  It is included as the starting point of a local tour of Brighton architecture. along with Brighton Pavilion, Brighton Pier and the Regency Brunswick Town.

References 

Hotels in Brighton and Hove
Brighton
Butlins hotels
Hotels established in 1938
Hotel buildings completed in 1938